A patty is a flattened cake or disc of chopped or ground ingredients prepared and served in various ways.

Patty may also refer to:

Pastry
 Various kinds of turnover (food)
 Jamaican patty
 Haitian patty

Names
 Patty (given name), a given name and diminutive forms of Patricia and Patrick
 Patty (Peanuts), a character in the Peanuts comic strip
 Patty (singer), a vocalist in Japan
 Patty (surname), a family name

Other uses
 "Patty" (The Good Place), an episode of the American comedy television series The Good Place

See also
 Paddy (disambiguation)
 Padi (disambiguation)
 Patti (disambiguation)
 Pattie (disambiguation)
 Pattycake
 Paty (disambiguation)